Arvensis, a Latin adjective meaning in the fields, is the specific epithet of the following:
 Acinos arvensis, the basil thyme, a species of plant of the genus Acinos
 Agaricus arvensis, the horse mushroom, a mushroom of the genus Agaricus
 Alauda arvensis, the skylark, a small passerine bird species
 Anagallis arvensis, the scarlet pimpernel or red pimpernel, red chickweed, poorman's barometer, shepherd's weather glass
 Anchusa arvensis, the small bugloss and annual bugloss, a plant species of the genus Anchusa
 Anthemis arvensis, the corn chamomile or mayweed, scentless chamomile and field chamomile, anthémis des champs
 Aphanes arvensis, the field parsley-piert, the western lady's-mantle, the parsley breakstone, a species of the genus Aphanes
 Bromus arvensis, the field brome, a grass species native to Europe and Asia
 Buglossoides arvensis, a synonym for Lithospermum arvense
 Calendula arvensis, the field marigold, a flowering plant species
 Coleosporium sonchi-arvensis, a synonym for Coleosporium tussilaginis 
 Convolvulus arvensis, the field bindweed, a bindweed species native to Europe and Asia
 Knautia arvensis, a species in the genus Knautia
 Mentha arvensis, the field mint, the wild mint or the corn mint, a plant species with a circumboreal distribution
 Myosotis arvensis, the field forget-me-not, a herbaceous annual plant species
 Nigella arvensis, an annual plant species of the genus Nigella
 Ononis arvensis, a herb species of the genus Ononis
 Ranunculus arvensis, a plant species of the genus Ranunculus
 Sherardia arvensis, the field madder, a flowering plant species
 Sinapis arvensis, the wild mustard or charlock, a plant species
 Sonchus arvensis, the corn sow thistle, dindle, field sow thistle, gutweed, swine thistle, tree sow thistle or field sowthistle, a plant species
 Spergula arvensis, the corn spurry
 Torilis arvensis, a species of flowering plant in the parsley family known by the common names common hedge parsley and spreading hedge parsley
 Veronica arvensis, the corn speedwell, common speedwell, speedwell, rock Speedwell, wall Speedwell, a medicinal plant species and a noxious weed
 Viola arvensis, the field pansy, a flowering plant species

See also
 Arvense, a Latin word with the same meaning